James 5 is the fifth (and last) chapter of the Epistle of James in the New Testament of the Christian Bible. The author identifies himself as "James, a servant of God and of the Lord Jesus Christ" and the epistle is traditionally attributed to James the brother of Jesus, written in Jerusalem between 48 and 61 CE. Alternatively, some scholars argue that it is a pseudographical work written after 61 CE. This chapter contains a warning to the rich and an exhortation to be patient until the coming of the Lord.

Text
The original text was written in Koine Greek. This chapter is divided into 20 verses.

Textual witnesses
Some early manuscripts containing the text of this chapter are:
Greek
Papyrus 100 (3rd century; extant verse 1)
Codex Vaticanus (325-350)
Codex Sinaiticus (330-360)
Codex Alexandrinus (400-440)
Codex Ephraemi Rescriptus (ca. 450; extant verse 1)
Papyrus 74 (7th century; complete)
Coptic 
Papyrus 6 (~AD 350; all verses).
Latin
León palimpsest (7th century; complete)

Warning to the Rich (5:1–3)
Written like an abbreviation of Jesus' criticism against the rich.

The Oppression of the Poor and the Just (5:4-6)
This section exposes the unjust ways of the rich who gain their goods by oppressing the poor.

Patience until the Coming of the Lord (5:7-20)

Verse 11
Indeed we count them blessed who endure. You have heard of the perseverance of Job and seen the end intended by the Lord—that the Lord is very compassionate and merciful.
Job was not a prophet, but as a righteous man he is used in Jewish stories circulating in James' day to represent the 'perfect example of patient endurance'.

Verse 12
But above all, my brethren, do not swear, either by heaven or by earth or with any other oath. But let your "Yes" be "Yes," and your "No," "No," lest you fall into judgment.
Cross reference: Matthew 5:37

Verse 16
Confess your trespasses to one another, and pray for one another, that you may be healed. The effective, fervent prayer of a righteous man avails much.
 "Confess your faults one to another": Sins committed against one another should be acknowledged for mutual forgiveness and reconciliation at all times.
"A righteous man": a person, who is justified by Christ's righteousness; also the upright and sincere one, such as Job, Joseph of Arimathea, and others; even though not without sin, as shown in the following verse: "Elijah was a man of like passions", but a just man, and his prayer was prevalent.
 "The effectual fervent (Greek:) prayer" has power, which is with the Spirit, not in a cold, lukewarm, lifeless, formal, and customary way. The Vulgate Latin version renders it, "daily", which is constant and continual prayer, without ceasing, as in the parable of the widow and the unjust judge. Some translate the word "inspired": the Spirit of God breathes into men the breath of spiritual life, or may be rendered "inwrought", as a true prayer is not what is written in a book, but what is wrought in the heart, by the Spirit of God; and such prayer is always heard, and regarded by him. The Jews have a great notion of prayer as 'the power of prayer', is strong; and extol it above all other services, it is better than good works, or than offerings and sacrifices; and particularly, the prayer of righteous men may turn "the holy blessed God from wrath to mercy".

Verse 17
Elijah was a man with a nature like ours, and he prayed earnestly that it would not rain, and it did not rain on the earth for three years and six months.

 "Elijah" (Greek: Elias, as in KJV): points to the prophet "Elijah the Tishbite".  Septuagint renders the name in Greek Elias in Malachi 4:5, just as written in the Greek text of this verse. During his life, he was being charged by King Ahab as a "troubler of Israel", and persecuted by Jezebel, who tried to kill him, but was fed by ravens, by the widow of Zarephath, and by an angel; also, he asked to die, but by the wonderful power of God, he can see God, who "translated him, that he should not see death".
"A man with a nature like ours": James gives an instance of earnest and fervent efficacious prayer in Elijah, in accordance with Jewish tradition (2 Esdras 7:109; m. Ta'an. 2:4; b. Sanh. 113a), in particular the example of Elijah and his prayer for rain. James says that he was a "man", in contrast to some Jewish notion that Elijah was not born of a father and mother, but was an angel, who was clothed with the four elements of the world. Also, he was by nature no better than others, as he himself confesses that he was no better than his fathers.
"Prayed earnestly": or "prayed in prayer" as in Jewish literature it is said "he prayed his prayer" or, in other way of saying, "they prayed prayers", not merely externally or formally, but with great intenseness of the Spirit. The first time, he prayed "that it might not rain", then later, he may have prayed each of the seven times he sent his servant to look out for a sign of rain. The prayer "that it would not rain" (KJV: "that it might not rain") is not recorded implicitly, but can be deducted from  where he says, "as the Lord God of Israel liveth, before whom I stand, there shall not be dew, nor rain, these years, but according to my word"; as such the passage is understood by the Jewish commentators that the phrase, "before whom I stand", is paraphrased as "before whom I am used to stand", "in prayer". Another phrase, "according to my word", is interpreted, that the rain should not come naturally, but it should only descend when Elijah "prayed for it", and it was so. According to early church tradition, James himself was known as 'just' (dikaios) and a man of powerful prayer,
 "On the earth": means "on the land of Israel", as this was in judgment upon the Kingdom of Israel in the times of Ahab. This instance of prayer is mentioned, not to be imitated, as Christians are not to pray for judgments, unless they receive a divine order for it as Elijah had, but to show the efficacy of prayer uttered according to the will of God.
 "Three years and six months": This exactly agrees with the words of Jesus Christ (Luke 4:25), although this time span is not found in the text of Old Testament.

See also
 Elijah
 Job
 Related Bible parts: 1 Kings 17, 1 Kings 19, Job 6, Job 13, Job 42, Luke 4, Galatians 5

References

Sources

External links
 King James Bible - Wikisource
English Translation with Parallel Latin Vulgate 
Online Bible at GospelHall.org (ESV, KJV, Darby, American Standard Version, Bible in Basic English)
Multiple bible versions at Bible Gateway (NKJV, NIV, NRSV etc.)

05